Galuapur Inter College is a government-aided, co-educational, senior secondary school that serves students from grades 6-12.  The school is affiliated with the Uttar Pradesh Board of High School and Intermediate Education. The official language of instruction is Hindi.

History

Galuapur Inter College was founded in 1950. The School initially consisted on three-room building. Art was added to the curriculum, followed by science in 1967, and then biology in 1973. In 1981, the school was categorized as a "good school" among rural senior secondary schools in the Kanpur Dehat District, as stated in chapter four of the thesis published on Shodhganga. It was upgraded to a secondary school in 1998. In 2011, a Facebook page was created for "Galuapur Inter College," but there has been little-to-no activity for the past decade. In August 2013, a new profile photo was uploaded, which shows a drape with the name "Prabhat Engineering College, Kanpur (Dehat)" on the main gate.

Location
Galuapur Inter College is located in a small village called Galuapur, in Derapur Block, Kanpur Dehat District, Uttar Pradesh,  India. The location is approximately 8 km from the town of Rura and 6 km from the town of Derapur. This school is approachable by an all-weather road.

Facilities

This school has the following facilities:
Library 
Playground
Sports Facility
Well-equipped science laboratories (used for physics, chemistry, and biology)
Vocational education

List of Head Masters

For the UPS stage:
Uday Singh Gaur
Kanhaiya Lal Pal
Kripa Shankar Shukla
For the high school stage:
Raghunath Prasad Katiyar (Off.)
Prakash Chandra Mishra (29 November 1969 – 1 July 1970)

List of Principals

Prakash Chandra Mishra (1 July 1970 – 30 June 1992)
Chandrika Prasad Pandey (Off.) (1 July 1992 – 30 June 1993)
Prakash Narayan Pandey  (Off.) (1 July 1993 – 30 June 1998)
Shyam Sundar Dwivedi    (Off.) (1 July 1998 – 30 June 2003)
Krishna Gopal Pandey (Off.) (1 July 2003 – 26 March 2010)
Rajesh Shrivastava (27 March 2010 – 25 April 2013)
Om Prakash Dubey (Off.) (26 April 2013 – 31 March 2019)
Om Prakash Singh         (Off.) (1 April 2019 - in office)

Notable Teachers
Prakash Chandra Mishra
Asharfi Lal Mishra,(5) 
Radhey Shyam Chaturvedi

References

Gallery

Intermediate colleges in Uttar Pradesh
High schools and secondary schools in Uttar Pradesh
Education in Kanpur Dehat district
Educational institutions established in 1950
1950 establishments in Uttar Pradesh